Trpinja is a village and an eponymous municipality in the Vukovar-Syrmia County in eastern Croatia. The village is located on the D55 road between Osijek and Vukovar. Landscape of the Trpinja Municipality is marked by the Pannonian Basin plains and agricultural fields of corn, wheat, common sunflower and sugar beet.

The Municipality of Trpinja was established in 1997 by the UNTAES administration as one of new predominantly Serb municipalities in order to ensure access to local self-government to Serb community in the region after the end of the Croatian War of Independence. The municipality is northernmost one in the Vukovar-Syrmia Country and there are in total 7 villages within municipal boundaries. At the time of 2011 census the municipality had a population of 5,572 and the village of Trpinja itself 1,537.

Languages and names

Settlement's name 

The villages of Trpinja, Bobota and Vera share a common legend about the origin of their names. According to the legend, the ancestors of today's inhabitants of villages, who settled at the time of the Great Serb Migrations under Arsenije III Čarnojević, were called Bobe. They were fleeing from the Ottoman Empire conquests of Balkan as they wanted to preserve their religious freedom.

This legendary religious commitment and orthodoxy was coined in the local phrase Bobe endured for the faith or originally in Serbian Bobe trpiše za veru. The family name of 'Bobe' was used as the basis for the name of Bobota, the word 'endured' ( the name of Trpinja was created and from the word 'faith' the name of Vera was coined.

Another story tells that the name of Trpinja originated from a landowner Trpimir who owned the land in the vicinity.

Serbian 

Serbian together with the Serbian Cyrillic alphabet is the second co-official language within the boundaries of the municipality including all settlement except predominantly Croat one Ćelije. The statute guarantees that Serbian Cyrillic alphabet will be used in text of seals and stamps, on plates of representative, executive and administrative bodies of the municipality, as well as on those of legal entities with public authority. Pre-school education for the Serb community is organized and conducted in Serbian and Cyrillic according to the local statute. Elementary education is provided in Serbian as well.

Geography
The municipality is located on the border between historical regions of Slavonia and Syrmia, in the southern part of Pannonian Basin in the Podunavlje region. The total area of the municipality is 123.87 km2 (47.8 sq mi). The river Vuka flows through the municipality in length of 8 kilometers as well as an artificial Bobota Canal in the length of 20 kilometers. The territory of the municipality is completely flat, with very fertile black soil. The municipality shares borders with Borovo, Bogdanovci, Nuštar, Tordinci, Šodolovci and Erdut municipalities, with the town of Vukovar and the city of Osijek.

Climate and weather
Trpinja municipality has a moderately warm and rainy continental climate as defined by the Köppen climate classification. Due to the continental influence temperature differences during the year are more pronounced than in the rest of the country.

Transportation
Trpinja is connected by D2 road with rest of the country. D55 road goes through the village Bršadin. County road Ž4111 goes through the villages of Pačetin, Bobota and Vera.

Railway line M601 that connects Vinkovci, Borovo Naselje and Vukovar goes through the Trpinja municipality.

Biome

History

Name of the Trpinja settlement was first mentioned in 1329 in one document issued in the medieval Kingdom of Hungary. Document is today kept in Budapest, Hungary. In fact in this period at the place of present Trpinja were settlements Mala Trpinja, Velika Trpinja and Slavenska Trpinja. Villages were owned by the gentry until they were conquered by the Ottoman Empire in 1536.  Ottoman authorities settled Serb population in this area, which resulted in decreased percentage of local Hungarians. Area was under Ottoman administration until 1691, when it was conquered by the Habsburg Monarchy. According to the census of 1732, Trpinja had 109 Serb families. Construction of the Serbian Orthodox church began in 1750 and was completed in 1755. The first school in Trpinja was opened in 1776, while in 1859 Trpinja had a factory for spinning silk. In 1882, population of Trpinja numbered about 1,800 people in 400 homes. The inhabitants were Christian Orthodox Serbs, except 2-3 families who were of Roman Catholic faith. Although the period of First World War in the village was marked by disease and poverty, Trpinja residents hosted the population of the village of Jakovo. From 27 December 1920 (when they arrived in Vukovar) soldiers and families of the White Russian émigrés who were followers of Pyotr Wrangel settled in Bobota, Pačetin, Bršadin, Trpinja and Vera. The villagers participated in the anti-fascist struggle during World War II, and one number of them ended up in concentration camps of Independent State of Croatia. During the war, 452 soldiers from Trpinja fought in the 9th Slavonian Brigade, of which 75 were killed. 170 Romani people from Trpinja were arrested by Ustaše and taken to Jasenovac concentration camp in 1942, no one of them returned. According to the 1981 census, Trpinja had 2,243 inhabitants.

Between 1991 and 1997, Trpinja was controlled by the Serbs who rebelled against the democratically elected Croatian Government. During that time, the non-Serb population was subjected to unlawful arrests, imprisonment, physical, mental and sexual abuse and killings by the members of local Serb paramilitary formations. Civilians were physically and mentally abused on a daily basis, forced to sing Chetnik songs, threatened with mutilation by cutting off limbs and body parts, men were forced to kneel in the village center and graze the grass, women were threatened with rape, with one being raped and another forced to drink blood that was leaking from the broken nose of an abused man. Ten captives from Trpinja, as well as civilians captured in Borovo and severely wounded civilians from the Borovo Commerce hospital, who had previously been brutally beaten, had been executed in the nearby Bobotski kanal. In 2016, 10 Serbs were convicted for war crimes against prisoners of war and civilians to prison sentences ranging between 5 and 20 years. During the Battle of Vukovar, Yugoslav People's Army (JNA) and various paramilitary forces from Serbia tried to break through the Vukovar defense from the direction of Trpinja, namely through Trpinjska cesta, the road that connected Trpinja and Vukovar. However, the Croatian soldiers of the Croatian National Guard (ZNG) and civilian volunteers, led by Major general Blago Zadro, offered strong resistance, during which they destroyed about 30 JNA tanks and armored vehicles which gave road the nickname "tank graveyard". Trpinja was reintegrated into Croatia with the Erdut Agreement.

Demographics

Population
There are 1,537 inhabitants in village Trpinja and 5,572 inhabitants in the municipality according to the 2011 census. The majority of the population are Serbs, making up 89.75% of the population according to the 2011 population census. With pronounced issue of population decline in eastern Croatia caused by population ageing, effects of the Croatian War of Independence and emigration after the accession of Croatia to the European Union, the population of the municipality dropped to 4,167 residents at the time of 2021 census.

Religion

Church of the Transfiguration of the Lord is a Serbian Orthodox church in village of Trpinja listed in Register of Cultural Goods of Croatia. On the territory of the municipality there are also Serbian Orthodox Church of St. George in Bobota as well as churches in Vera, Pačetin and Bršadin. There is also Roman Catholic church in village of Ćelije.

Politics

Joint Council of Municipalities
The Municipality of Trpinja is one of seven Serb majority member municipalities within the Joint Council of Municipalities, inter-municipal sui generis organization of ethnic Serb community in eastern Croatia established on the basis of Erdut Agreement. As Serb community constitute majority of the population of the municipality it is represented by 2 delegated Councillors at the Assembly of the Joint Council of Municipalities, double the number of Councilors to the number from Serb minority municipalities in Eastern Croatia.

Municipality government
The municipality assembly is composed of 15 representatives with one additional member added in 2017 to achieve proportional representation of municipal ethnic Croat community.  Assembly members come from electoral lists winning  more than 5% of votes. Dominant party in Trpinja since the reintegration of eastern Slavonia in 1998 is Independent Democratic Serb Party with rise of support for independent lists in recent years. Some 2,557 or 56.67 % out of 4,512 voters participated in 2017 Croatian local elections with 92.14 % valid votes. With 58,31% and 1.505 votes independent Miroslav Palić was elected as municipality major with Svetislav Mikerević from Independent Democratic Serb Party coming second with 39,29 %. As of 2017, the member parties/lists are:

|- style="background-color:#E9E9E9" align=center
!colspan=2|Party
!Votes
!%
!Seats
|-
| bgcolor=#00A859|
|align=left valign=top|Candidates list of group of voters-Miroslav Palić||1,109 ||47.07 %||8
|-
| bgcolor=#C50200|
|align=left valign=top|Independent Democratic Serb Party||815||34.59 %||5+1
|-
| bgcolor=#FFCC66|
|align=left valign=top|Candidates list of group of voters-Miroljub Maširević
||164 ||6.96 %||1
|-
| bgcolor=#FF6600|
|align=left valign=top|Social Democratic Party of Croatia||136||5.77 %||1
|-
| bgcolor=grey|
|align=left valign=top|Candidates list of group of voters-Tatjana Milinković
||132 ||5,60 %||0
|-
|align=left colspan=2|Invalid/blank votes||201||7.86 %||—
|-
|align=left colspan=2|Total||2,557||100||—
|-
|align=left colspan=2|Registered voters/turnout||4,512||56.67 %||—
|-
|align=left colspan=8|

|-
|align=left colspan=8|Source: : page 87-90 
|}

Economy
Trpinja is an underdeveloped municipality which is statistically classified as the First Category Area of Special State Concern by the Government of Croatia. The most common economic activities are tillage and animal husbandry.

Education

Elementary School in Trpinja is one of the oldest schools in the region, established in 1776. Classes at the school take place exclusively in the Serbian (exceptions are Croatian and foreign languages). Upon completion of eight years of elementary school, students usually continue their education in secondary schools in Vukovar where they could attend classes in Serbian. The three most popular universities after high school are University of Novi Sad, University of Osijek and University of Belgrade.

Culture

Municipality Symbols
Coat of arms of Trpinja Municipality is in yellow (golden) color with green clover with three leaves in the middle. Flag of Trpinja Municipality is a monochrome blue with the coat of arms in the middle of the flag.

Points of Interest

Church of the Transfiguration of the Lord in Trpinja was built from 1753 until 1757. The church is a cultural monument and is on the list of immovable cultural heritage of Republic of Croatia. Valuable objects in the church are also on the list of movable cultural heritage of Republic of Croatia. Object is in regular use and is also open for visitors at certain time. Tourist visitors pay no entrance.

At the central site in Trpinja there is a monument dedicated to fallen soldiers from World War II and the fallen soldiers and victims of war in 1991.

Local cultural society "Mladost" was founded in 1995. Its work preserves and promotes the folk customs and culture of Serbs of the Croatian Danube region.

Associations and Institutions
In the village exist a volunteer fire department Trpinja, folk Cultural and Artistic Association "MLADOST", Serbian Cultural Society "Prosvjeta", football club "Sinđelić", chess club "Trpinja", Hunting Association "Srndać" and Hunting Association "Trpinja", Association of subsidiaries of pensioners of Trpinja municipality and Subsidiary of pensioners of Trpinja, "Treća životna dob" ("Third age"), The association of anti-fascist fighters of the National Liberation War and Anti-Fascists of Trpinja municipality.

Settlements 
There are seven villages in the municipality.

Sport 
In 2011 local amateur football club Sinđelić, which is named after Stevan Sinđelić, was a champion of the regional Veterans League of Joint Council of Municipalities. The Chess Club Trpinja is also active.

Notable natives and residents
Slavko Dokmanović

Twin municipalities – Sister municipalities
  Bačka Palanka, Serbia

See also
Church of the Transfiguration of the Lord, Trpinja
Joint Council of Municipalities
Podunavlje (Croatia)

References

Sources

External links

  

Municipalities of Croatia
Joint Council of Municipalities
Populated places in Syrmia
Populated places in Vukovar-Syrmia County
Serb communities in Croatia